Dhanama? Daivama? is a 1973 Indian Telugu-language drama film, produced by DVS Raju and directed by C. S. Rao. It stars N. T. Rama Rao and Jamuna, with music composed by T. V. Raju.

Plot 
Lawyer Ramachandra Rao (N. T. Rama Rao) a disciple of justice, lives with his devoted wife Janaki (Jamuna), their three children along with his brother Mohan (Chandra Mohan) and sister Shanta (P. R. Varalakshmi). But Ramachandra Rao always in financial problems as he stands for honesty and not able to maintain a huge family. Janaki always consoles him by telling that to keep faith in God. Times get worse, his sister's marriage breaks up, moreover, his son dies due to lack of medicines. Eventually, his sister is molested by a cruel person Bhupathi (Satyanarayana) and she commits suicide. Here Ramachandra Rao loses faith on God and understands the entire is revolving around the money. There onwards, Ramachandra Rao wins so many false cases and earns a lot of money when Janaki pleads him that too much money brings sorrow. But he does not care about her words and the distance increases between them. Parallelly, Mohan loves Radha (Venniradai Nirmala), daughter of a millionaire Panchanandam (Mukkamala). Thereafter, Bhupathi introduces Vijayanti (Vijaya Bhanu) a rich woman to Ramachandra Rao in a case and she tries to attract him, but he does not yield. Bhupathi also draws Mohan into a business and makes him a spoiled brat. Once Bhupathi molests a girl, Ramachandra Rao protects him in that case. The innocent girl commits suicide, knowing it, Ramachandra Rao goes into depression when Janaki again consoles him and makes him normal. Vijayanti expresses her love towards Ramachandra Rao, talks low about Janaki and he throws her out, saying that no one will be equal to his wife. There, Vijayanti develops a grudge against Janaki and decides to separate them by saying that Ramachandra Rao is going to marry her. Janaki leaves the house along with children and becomes mentally sick. Meanwhile, conflicts arise between Bhupathi & Vyjayanti and he stabs her and flees. Before dying, Vijayanti reveals Ramachandra Rao that Bhupathi is responsible for his sister's death. At that point in time, Bhupathi also kidnaps and tries to marry Radha forcibly whom Ramachandra Rao saves and sees the end of Bhupathi. In his return, he spots Janaki on her deathbed when Ramchandra Rao throws his entire money before doctors to save his wife. But the doctors reply that no medicine and money can cure a mental patient. Realizing it, Ramchandra Rao again prays to God and Janaki survives. Finally, the movie ends on a happy note with knowing the fact that God is superior to Money.

Cast 
N. T. Rama Rao as Ramachandra Rao
Jamuna as Janaki
Satyanarayana as Bhupathi
Padmanabham as Ganapathi
Allu Ramalingaiah
Chandra Mohan as Mohan
Mukkamala as Panchanadham
Sakshi Ranga Rao
Malladi as Tata
Jagga Rao
Potti Prasad
Venniradai Nirmala as Radha
P. R. Varalakshmi as Shanti
Vijaya Bhanu as Vyjayanthi

Soundtrack 

Music composed by T. V. Raju. Lyrics were written by C. Narayana Reddy.

References

External links 

 

Indian drama films
Films scored by T. V. Raju
Films directed by C. S. Rao